Scotchtown (Scottish Gaelic: Baile nan Gàidheal) is a community in the Cape Breton Regional Municipality of Nova Scotia, Canada.

The community is located immediately south of New Waterford.

References
Scotchtown  on Destination Nova Scotia

General Service Areas in Nova Scotia
Communities in the Cape Breton Regional Municipality